Club Eleven was a nightclub in London between 1948 and 1950 which played a significant role in the emergence of the bebop jazz movement in Britain.

The club was so named because it had 11 founders – business manager Harry Morris and ten British bebop musicians. It first opened at 41 Great Windmill Street in Soho in 1948, and had two house bands, one led by Ronnie Scott and the other by John Dankworth. Scott's sidemen included Tony Crombie, Lennie Bush, Tommy Pollard, and Hank Shaw, while Dankworth's included Leon Calvert, Bernie Fenton, Joe Muddell, and Laurie Morgan. When Scott toured the US, Don Rendell filled his spot. Denis Rose organised many of the activities at the club.

Drugs raid
In 1950, the club moved to 50 Carnaby Street, but closed a few months later after a police raid.

A ship's steward had been arrested in possession of cannabis, and under interrogation stated he had purchased the drugs at Club Eleven, leading the police to raid the club on 15 April. The police raid recovered cannabis and cocaine, and an empty morphine ampoule. This led to the arrest of several young white British men, shaking social assumptions about drug use being confined to the lower classes and non-whites.

Recognition
In 2009, Club Eleven was named by the Brecon Jazz Festival as one of 12 venues which had made the most important contributions to jazz music in the United Kingdom.

See also
List of jazz clubs

References and sources
References

Sources
"Club Eleven"/"Nightclubs and Other Venues". Grove Jazz online.
Reminiscences, Don Rendell (1967).
http://henrybebop.co.uk/clubs.htm

Defunct jazz clubs
Jazz clubs in London
Nightclubs in London
Former buildings and structures in the City of Westminster
1948 establishments in the United Kingdom
1950 disestablishments in the United Kingdom
Music venues completed in 1948
1950 in cannabis